"Less than Zero" is a song by Canadian singer the Weeknd. It was released to French contemporary hit radio on July 7, 2022, as the fourth single from his fifth studio album Dawn FM (2022). The song was written by the Weeknd, Max Martin, and Oscar Holter, and produced by the three alongside Oneohtrix Point Never.

Background and promotion
The song's name was first revealed on January 5, 2022, when Canadian singer the Weeknd posted the track listing for the song's parent album Dawn FM (2022). A lyric video for the song directed by Micah Bickham was released on January 9, 2022. It was also one of the songs performed in the television music special The Dawn FM Experience.

The song was given a limited single release in France, with it being sent to contemporary hit radio on July 7, 2022, in the country.

"Less than Zero" also serves as the official theme song for WWE's WrestleMania 39. This marks the fourth straight year a song by the Weeknd serves as the theme song for the annual event.

Lyrics and composition
"Less than Zero" has been described as a slow-dance new wave track where the Weeknd sings about remaining regretful sentiments he has after the end of a relationship and how he blames himself. It is in the key of C major.

Critical reception 
"Less Than Zero" was met with widespread acclaim. Critics noted the song as a highlight on the record, with particular praise being given to the song's production, lyrics, its acoustic ending and The Weeknd's emotionally resonant vocals. Critics from Billboard noted that the song had the ability to potentially achieve the top 40 success that the singles from the Weeknd's previous After Hours predecessors.

Charts

Release history

References

External links
 
 
 

2022 songs
Songs written by the Weeknd
The Weeknd songs
Song recordings produced by the Weeknd
Song recordings produced by Max Martin
Republic Records singles
Songs written by Max Martin
Songs written by Oscar Holter
Song recordings produced by Oscar Holter